The White Mountains is a  mountain range in the Yukon-Koyukuk Census Area of the U.S. state of Alaska. It lies between Beaver Creek and Preacher Creek, and was named by prospectors for its composition of white limestone. The White Mountains and Ray Mountains together constitute the Yukon-Tanana Uplands, an area of low mountain ranges and high ground in Interior Alaska.

References
 

Landforms of Yukon–Koyukuk Census Area, Alaska
Mountain ranges of Alaska
Mountains of Unorganized Borough, Alaska